Cockscomb is a fleshy growth or crest on the top of the head of a male fowl.

Cockscomb may also refer to:

 Rhinanthus minor, a species of flowering plant
 Certain species of the ornamental plant genus Celosia, if the flower heads are crested by fasciation
 Celosia argentea var. cristata, an herbaceous plant resembling the head of a rooster
 Cockscomb (mountain), a mountain in the Eastern Cape province of South Africa
 The Cockscomb, a ridge in southern Utah; see U.S. Route 89 in Utah
 A type of cap and bells or jester's cap

See also 
 Coxcomb (disambiguation)
 Celosia argentea or plumed cockscomb, an herbaceous plant of tropical origin
 Cockscomb Basin Wildlife Sanctuary in Belize

 

eo:Kresto